The Anishinabek Police Service (APS) is the shared police force for 15 of 40 communities in the Anishinabek Nation (Formerly "Union of Ontario Indians") and 1 community in the Nishnawbe Aski Nation (NAN).

Created in 1994, the force has 71 sworn officers and 20 civilian members at 12 detachments serving 16 communities.

History
On March 30, 1992, a five-year Ontario First Nations Policing Agreement was signed by Grand Council of Treaty 3, Nishnawbe Aski Nation, Association of Iroquois & Allied Indians, Anishinabek Nation, Six Nations and the Provincial and Federal Government.

In 1994, Garden River, Curve Lake, Sagamok and Saugeen First Nations stepped away from the Ontario Provincial Police (OPP) to form the Anishinabek Police Service. At this time it was also decided that Garden River would be home to Headquarters because geographically it is situated in the center of the province.

Detachments

North Region
 Fort William Detachment
 Fort William First Nation
 Ginoogaming Detachment
 Ginoogaming First Nation
 Pic River / Pic Mobert Detachments
 Ojibways of the Pic River First Nation
 Netmizaaggamig Nishnaabeg (Pic Mobert)
 Rocky Bay Detachment
 Biinjitiwaabik First Nation

Central Region
 Garden River Detachment
 Garden River First Nation
 Nipissing / Wahnapitae / Dokis Detachments
 Dokis First Nation
 Nipissing First Nation
 Wahnapitae First Nation
 Sagamok Detachment
 Sagamok First Nation
South Region
 Christian Island Detachment
 Beausoleil First Nation
 Curve Lake Detachment
 Curve Lake First Nation
 Kettle & Stony Point Detachment
 Chippewas of Kettle and Stony Point First Nation
 Shawanaga / Magnetawan / Wasauksing Detachment
 Magnetawan First Nation
 Shawanaga First Nation
 Wasauksing First Nation

References

External links
 Anishinabek Police Service

Law enforcement agencies of Ontario
Ojibwe in Canada
Anishinabek Nation